Oostmalle Airfield  is an airport in the Antwerp province of the Flemish Region of Belgium. It is located east of the town of Zoersel, south of the town of Oostmalle, and west of the town of Wechelderzande, in the municipality of Malle.

See also 
 List of airports in Belgium

References

External links
 Zoersel - Oostmalle (EBZR)
 
 Aero Para Club der Kempen (Dutch)
 Zweefvliegen Zoersel-Oostmalle Belgie (Dutch language)

Airports in Antwerp Province
Military airbases established in 1955
Malle
1955 establishments in Belgium